The Mystery of the Double Cross is a 1917 film and one of the few American silent action film serials to survive in complete form. It was directed by Louis J. Gasnier and William Parke, from a story written by Gilson Willets, produced by the Astra Film Corporation and released in weekly chapters by Pathé, starting March 18, 1917.

Plot
Peter Hale (Leon Bary) is returning to America from overseas via steamship to receive his inheritance. On board, he receives a telegram warning him to beware the Double Cross. He doesn't know what it means, until he becomes enamored of a mysterious woman occupying cabin no. 7. When a submarine is sighted, there is panic on shipboard. Peter and the mysterious woman are thrown together, and in the ensuing action, he sees a double cross symbol on her right arm, just below the shoulder. When the ship arrives in New York, Peter loses track of the woman.

His father's will stipulates that he is to marry a woman, "perfect in mind and body," who has been selected for him. She will reveal herself to him when the time comes, and he will know her by the sign of the double cross on her arm. If anyone else marries her, then that person will inherit the Hale fortune.

Pondering this in his hotel room, Peter overhears Bridgely Bentley (Ralph Stuart), a gangster and social pirate, reveal a plan to bilk Herbert Brewster out of some valuable land. Brewster is unaware that there are valuable oil reserves beneath the land. Peter knows Brewster, who was a friend of Pete's father. Peter races ahead and obtains an option on the property to keep Bridgely from carrying out his scheme, thereby earning his enmity. But Peter also finds that Brewster's daughter, Phillipa, is the woman he met on board the ship. He begins to woo her, but is puzzled by how she at times accepts his courtship, and the next minute, rejects him, claiming that they have never met. When he tries to confront her, a Masked Stranger intervenes, telling him he must be true to the girl of the Double Cross. Bentley finds the original letter sent to Peter and realizes that if he can marry the girl of the Double Cross, the Hale fortune will be his.

The rest of the serial plays variations on these conflicts. Rather than traditional cliffhangers—the death traps are usually foiled in the course of each episode—the chapters end on an air of mystery or tension about what exactly is going on.

Cast
 Mollie King as Philippa Brewster
 Léon Bary as Peter Hale
 Ralph Stuart as Bridgey Bentley
 Gladden James as Dick Annersley
 Theodore Friebus as Jack Dunn
 Robert Brower as Herbert Brewster
 Harry L. Fraser
 Helene Chadwick
 Clarine Seymour

Chapter titles
 The Lady in Number 7
 The Masked Stranger
 An Hour to Live
 Kidnapped
 The Life Current
 The Dead Come Back
 Into Thin Air
 The Stranger Disposes
 When Jailbirds Fly
 The Hole-n-the-Wall
 Love's Sacrifice
 The Riddle of the Cross
 The Face of the Stranger
 The Hidden Brand
 The Double Cross

Production
Chapter 1 included a prologue in which actress Mollie King was shown at home receiving a letter inviting her to participate in the film and then, just as a serial fan might, reading the story and saying, "I'd like to play that!" The image then dissolved with King becoming the glamorously dressed Philippa of the film.

Reception
Like many American films of the time, The Mystery of the Double Cross was subject to cuts by city and state film censorship boards. The Chicago Board of Censors required a cut from Chapter 14 of the shooting on the stairs.

References

External links

1917 films
1910s action films
American action films
American silent serial films
American black-and-white films
Films directed by Louis J. Gasnier
Pathé Exchange film serials
1910s American films
Silent action films